The Vicious Circle is a 1948 American drama film directed by W. Lee Wilder and based on the play The Burning Bush by Heinz Herald and Geza Herczeg. The film is also known as The Woman in Brown.

Plot summary 
A rich Hungarian baron discovers that there are large oil deposits underneath properties owned by the villagers. He buys up all the property except those owned by Jewish families, who refuse to sell. In order to circumvent their refusal, he has the men charged with the murder of a woman, who had recently committed suicide.

Cast 
Conrad Nagel as Karl Nemesh - Defense Attorney
Fritz Kortner as Joseph Schwartz - Defendant tenant
Reinhold Schünzel as Baron Arady 
Philip Van Zandt as Calomar Balog - Special Investigator
Lyle Talbot as Prosecutor Miller
Edwin Maxwell as Presiding Judge
Frank Ferguson as Stark - State attorney
Lester Dorr as Andreas Molnar - Neighbor
Michael Mark as Gustav Horney - Land owner
Belle Mitchell as Mrs. Julianna Horney - Anna's Master
Nan Boardman as Mrs. Maria Tamashy - Anna's mother
Shirley Kneeland as Clara Tamashy - Anna's sister
Rita Gould as Ethel Mihaly
Eddie LeRoy as Samuel Schwartz (George)
David Alexander as Fisher
Ben Welden as Constable
Nina Hansen as Mrs. Schwartz
Mary Lou Harrington as Anna Tamashy
Peggy Wynne as Irene Peter
Robert Cherry as Marten
Sam Bernard as Herman
Rudolph Cameron as Dr. Daroush
Peter Brocco as Dr. Georges Samosch
Christina Vale as Margaret Daroush - Witness
Don C. Harvey
Fred Fox
Manfred Fuerst
Ruben Wendorf
David Bauer (billed as Herman Waldman)
Paul Baratoff

Soundtrack

External links 

1948 films
1948 drama films
American drama films
American black-and-white films
American films based on plays
Films directed by W. Lee Wilder
Films scored by Paul Dessau
Films with screenplays by Noel Langley
1940s English-language films
1940s American films